Harry Delmar was an American Broadway producer and later film director. He was born September 8, 1892 in  Missouri, USA. and died in Los Angeles on August 29, 1984. Prior to his stint as a Broadway producer, Delmar began his career as a Vaudeville song and dance man.

"Harry Delmar's Revels" was a musical review on Broadway, containing songs, women and Vaudeville skits. The book was by William K. Wells; Lyrics by Ballard MacDonald, Billy Rose; Music by Lester Lee, Jesse Greer, Jimmy Monaco. It ran Nov 28, 1927 - Mar 1928 at the Shubert Theatre. Delmar hired some of the finest stars of the day, with a cast including Hugh Cameron and Patsy Kelly. He also gave Bert Lahr his Broadway debut.

With the advent of sound in films, Delmar transferred his skills to the silver screen. Starting as a writer and moving quickly to director and producer. He utilized his experience with revues as inspiration for his films, many of which included the Eddie Elkins Orchestra.

At the end of his life, Delmar was working with Buddy Feyne to produce his review Up Your Alley.

Filmography
Writer:
After the Show (1929)
Syncopated Trial (1929)

Director:
America or Bust (1930)
Sixteen Sweeties (1930)
Ride 'em Cowboy (1930)
A Night in a Dormitory (1930)
Her Hired Husband (1930)
After the Show (1929)
Syncopated Trial (1929)

Producer:
A Night in a Dormitory (1930)
Her Hired Husband (1930)
After the Show (1929)

References

External links 
 Songwriters Hall of Fame Billy Rose

1892 births
1984 deaths
American theatre managers and producers
American film directors
Burials at Hollywood Forever Cemetery